Becske is a village in Nógrád county, Hungary.

References

External links 
 Street map 

Populated places in Nógrád County